David Franklin may refer to:
 David Franklin (actor) (born 1962), Australian actor
 David Franklin (broadcaster) (1908–1973), British panel member of the radio show My Music, former opera singer
 David Franklin (curator), former director of the Cleveland Museum of Art
 David Franklin (scientist) (born 1961), American microbiologist and whistleblower regarding pharmaceutical fraud

See also
 David Franklin Houston
 Dave Franklin (1895–1970), Tin Pan Alley songwriter